Edwin Stoughton may refer to:

Edwin H. Stoughton (1838-1868), American Civil War general and lawyer
Edwin W. Stoughton (1818-1882), American lawyer and ambassador